Randal W. Beard from the Brigham Young University, Provo, UT was named Fellow of the Institute of Electrical and Electronics Engineers (IEEE) in 2015 for contributions to the theory and practice of guidance, control, and team coordination of unmanned aerial vehicles.

References 

Fellow Members of the IEEE
Living people
Brigham Young University faculty
21st-century American engineers
Year of birth missing (living people)
American electrical engineers